Newmarket Hotel is a heritage-listed former hotel in Hamilton Hill, Western Australia.

Located at the corner of Rockingham Road and Cockburn Road, it was built in 1912, and operated as a hotel until the late 1990s.

It has sometimes been referred to as being in South Fremantle, and at other times, Hamilton Hill.

The hotel was often chosen as a terminating point for cycling events. It was also named as a tram line extension point, and was a local focal point for the horse racing industry. The hotel was a filming location in the 1991 cult film Black Neon.

Change in lease/management was regular during its operational years.

After being vacant for 18 years, it was renovated and reopened in 2017 as Hamilton House, a dance studio for the Swan River Ballet school.

See also

Coogee Hotel, Western Australia located a few kilometres south of the Newmarket Hotel

References

External links
 

Hotels in Western Australia
Hamilton Hill, Western Australia
State Register of Heritage Places in the City of Cockburn
South Fremantle, Western Australia